Potosi is a village in Grant County, Wisconsin, United States. The population was 688 at the 2010 census. The village is in the Town of Potosi.

History 
Potosi is located where Wisconsin's lead ore belt intersects with the Mississippi. The post office (1837 to present) was originally located between Van Buren and Head of the Hollow, then at Van Buren, then at La Fayette. In 1839, the leaders of three settlements (Snake Hollow, sometimes called Head of the Hollow, Van Buren, and La Fayette) decided to combine the villages. The new, larger community was named Potosi, and the post office moved one last time, to the center of the new, merged community.

There are several explanations for the origin of the name Potosi, but the correct one is unknown. Many mining towns are named Potosi, ultimately derived from the fabled silver mines of Potosí, Bolivia. Another explanation is that Potosi was named for Potosi, Missouri, where a lot of the early lead miners originated.  Another explanation is that Potosi is a corruption of "Potosa," the supposed name of the wife of Julien Dubuque, an early settler in the area. No evidence exists for this theory.

Potosi was the home of the Potosi Brewing Company, makers of "Good Old Potosi Beer," from 1852 to 1972. A brewery restoration project has begun to preserve the history and tradition of the company. The National Brewery Museum opened inside the premises of the brewery in 2008. Potosi Brewery crafts and distributes a variety of beers throughout the region. Potosi Brewery's mission is to channel all profits into its markets served to support historical and educational initiatives, and charitable causes.

Geography

Demographics

2010 census
As of the census of 2010, there were 688 people, 295 households, and 203 families living in the village. The racial makeup of the village was 98.7% White, 0.1% Native American, 0.7% Asian, 0.1% from other races, and 0.3% from two or more races. Hispanic or Latino of any race were 0.6% of the population.

There were 295 households, of which 26.8% had children under the age of 18 living with them, 55.3% were married couples living together, 10.5% had a female householder with no husband present, 3.1% had a male householder with no wife present, and 31.2% were non-families. 27.1% of all households were made up of individuals, and 12.5% had someone living alone who was 65 years of age or older. The average household size was 2.33 and the average family size was 2.79.

The median age in the village was 45.3 years. 21.4% of residents were under the age of 18; 8.6% were between the ages of 18 and 24; 19.6% were from 25 to 44; 30.9% were from 45 to 64; and 19.5% were 65 years of age or older. The gender makeup of the village was 48.5% male and 51.5% female.

2000 census
As of the census of 2000, there were 711 people, 302 households, and 199 families living in the village. The population density was 432.1 people per square mile (166.4/km2). There were 320 housing units at an average density of 194.5 per square mile (74.9/km2). The racial makeup of the village was 99.02% White, and 0.98% from two or more races. 0.98% of the population were Hispanic or Latino of any race.

There were 302 households, out of which 29.5% had children under the age of 18 living with them, 57.0% were married couples living together, 6.0% had a female householder with no husband present, and 34.1% were non-families. 30.8% of all households were made up of individuals, and 18.2% had someone living alone who was 65 years of age or older. The average household size was 2.35 and the average family size was 2.96.

In the village, the population was spread out, with 24.1% under the age of 18, 8.3% from 18 to 24, 26.6% from 25 to 44, 23.2% from 45 to 64, and 17.9% who were 65 years of age or older. The median age was 38 years. For every 100 females, there were 98.1 males. For every 100 females age 18 and over, there were 97.1 males.

The median income for a household in the village was $35,294, and the median income for a family was $47,955. Males had a median income of $28,478 versus $25,982 for females. The per capita income for the village was $17,189. About 4.9% of families and 7.3% of the population were below the poverty line, including 6.1% of those under age 18 and 11.5% of those age 65 or over.

Tourism
Known as "the Catfish Capital of Wisconsin," the village holds an annual Catfish Festival and Fireman's Fish Fry, typically on the 2nd weekend of August. The event includes a truck and tractor pull, beanbag and a euchre tournament, fireworks, live music, a parade, and the fish fry. The National Brewery Museum and Library opened in the village on the site of the Potosi Brewery in 2008. The museum features historic beer and brewing memorabilia, including signs, advertisements, bottles, cans, and miscellaneous paraphernalia.

Local road signs herald Potosi's Main Street as "the longest Main Street in the world." A newspaper article traces the claim to a 1950s item in Ripley's Believe It Or Not which made the more qualified statement that it is the longest Main Street without a cross street. Current maps show a three-mile stretch, with numerous streets—including one named "Cross Street"—that drain into it and end, forming T-shaped intersections, but no street that continues across it. The stretch is divided into two portions each with a distinct street name: North Main Street and South Main Street.

The Potosi Badger Huts Site, remnants of the region's lead mining history, are listed on the National Register of Historic Places and accessible by trail.

Notable people

William Biddlecome - lawyer
Joshua B. Bradbury - farmer, teacher, and legislator
Lafayette Caskey - carpenter and legislator
Edward John Dorn - United States Naval Governor of Guam
John Lewis Dyer - Methodist circuit rider, who carried gospel to Colorado in 1860s and 1870s; mined lead near Potosi in 1840s
Melvin Grigsby - Union Army and Spanish–American War veteran who served as South Dakota Attorney General
William Hull - lawyer and legislator
Keith Krepfle - football player
William Josiah MacDonald - U.S. Representative from Michigan
James Wilson Seaton - lawyer and legislator
Fred A. Thomas - Montana State Representative

References

Further reading
 Baumann, Elda Ottelie. "The History of Potosi". Wisconsin Magazine of History, 23:1 (September 1939), 44–57.

External links
 Potosi - Tennyson Chamber of Commerce
 Sanborn fire insurance maps: 1884 1900 1912
National Brewery Museum Video produced by PBS Wisconsin

Villages in Grant County, Wisconsin
Villages in Wisconsin